Yaşar Yılmaz (born 4 March 1930) was a Turkish Olympian sports wrestler in the Bantamweight and Featherweight division of Men's Greco-Roman style. He won three times the silver medal at the FILA Wrestling World Championships in 1955, 1958 and 1962. He competed at the 1956 Summer Olympics, and the 1960 Summer Olympics in Rome and placed fifth.

References

External links
 

1930 births
Living people
Sportspeople from Rize
Wrestlers at the 1956 Summer Olympics
Wrestlers at the 1960 Summer Olympics
Turkish male sport wrestlers
Olympic wrestlers of Turkey
World Wrestling Championships medalists
20th-century Turkish people
21st-century Turkish people